FCP or fcp may refer to:

Organisations
 Federation of Pentecostal Churches (Italy) (Italian: Federazione delle Chiese Pentecostali)
 Fellow of the College of Preceptors
 Fellow of the American College of Clinical Pharmacology
 Ferrocarril del Pacífico, a defunct Mexican railroad
 First Calgary Petroleums, a Canadian oil and gas company

Politics
 Family Coalition Party of British Columbia, a defunct political party in Canada
 Family Coalition Party of Ontario, a defunct political party in Canada
 Federation of Christian Populars, a defunct political party in Italy
 Forward Communist Party, a defunct political party in India
 French Communist Party, a French political party

Sport
 1. FC Passau, a German football club
 FC Penzberg, a German football club
 1. FC Pforzheim, a German football club
 FC Pocheon, a South Korean football club
 FC Porto, a Portuguese football club
 Full-court press, in basketball
 FC Prishtina, a Kosovar football club
 FC Paris and FC Paris (women), French football clubs

Science and technology
 Fibre Channel Protocol, a data transfer mechanism
 Final Cut Pro, video editing software
 Florid cutaneous papillomatosis, a syndrome

Other uses
 Family-centered practices
 Federal Contractors' Program, a program of the Canadian federal government
 First Canadian Place, a building in Toronto, Ontario, Canada
 Fonds commun de placement, a European collective investment scheme
 Forward commitment procurement
 Free-choice profiling
 Front controller pattern

See also
 Foolscap (disambiguation)